This article includes fixtures and current squads of Estonia U-18, U-16 and U-15 national football teams.

Estonia National Under-18 Squad 
Head coach: Indrek Koser ,
Assistant Coach: Andres Koogas ,
Goalkeeping Coach: Karli Kütt

Results and fixtures

Estonia National Under-16 Squad 
Head coach: Norbert Hurt ,
Assistant Coach: Sander Post ,
Goalkeeping Coach: Andrus Lukjanov

Results and fixtures

Forthcoming fixtures

Estonia National Under-15 Squad 
Head coach: Jan Harend ,
Head coach: Ludvig Tasane ,
Assistant Coach: Ilja Monakov ,
Assistant Coach: Joonas Ljaš ,
Goalkeeping Coach: Mattias Traublum ,
Goalkeeping Coach: Andrus Lukjanov

Results and fixtures

See also
Estonia national football team
Estonia national under-23 football team
Estonia national under-21 football team
Estonia national under-19 football team
Estonia national under-17 football team

References

External links
 Estonian Football Association Official Site
 2008 fixtures of Estonian national youth football teams

National youth association football teams
youth